Abkuarak (also Romanized as Ābkhūrak and Ābkhvorak; also known as Ābkharak, Ākhowrak, Ābkhorak,  Akhorak, and Ākhūrak) is a village in Qaleh Asgar Rural District, Lalehzar District, Bardsir County, Kerman Province, Iran. At the 2006 census, its population was 34, in 12 families.

References 

Populated places in Bardsir County